Louis-Saint-Laurent is a federal electoral district in Quebec, Canada, that has been represented in the House of Commons of Canada since 2004.

It was created in 2003 from parts of Portneuf and Quebec East ridings.

Geography
The riding, in the Quebec region of Capitale-Nationale, consists of the northwestern part of Quebec City, including parts of the boroughs of Laurentien, Les Rivières, and La Haute-Saint-Charles, along with the Wendake Indian reserve and the city of L'Ancienne-Lorette.

The neighbouring ridings are Portneuf—Jacques-Cartier, Charlesbourg—Haute-Saint-Charles, Québec, and Louis-Hébert.

The riding lost a small fraction of territory to Charlesbourg—Haute-Saint-Charles and gained a small fraction from Louis-Hébert during the 2012 electoral redistribution.

Demographics
According to the Canada 2011 Census

Ethnic groups: 94.9% White, 3.0% Indigenous, 0.6% Black, 1.5% Other
Languages: 96.8% French, 1.3% English, 1.9% Other
Religions: 88.9% Christian, 0.5% Muslim, 0.4% Other, 10.2% None
Median income: $35,225 (2010) 
Average income: $39,793 (2010)

History
The riding is named after former prime minister Louis St. Laurent, and is mostly a reconfigured version of his old riding of Quebec East; ironically, it has not been represented by an MP from his Liberal Party at any point since its creation. In the 2004 federal election, Bernard Cleary defeated Conservative candidate Josée Verner by some 3,000 votes. Verner's win in the 2006 election, was part of a Conservative breakthrough in Quebec that helped the party win government for the first time. After five years, Verner was swept out by the NDP's Alexandrine Latendresse as part of the NDP's sweep of Quebec City.

Members of Parliament

This riding has elected the following Members of Parliament:

Election results

|- bgcolor="white"

|- bgcolor="white"

Change from 2000 is based on redistributed results. Conservative Party change is based on the total of Canadian Alliance and Progressive Conservative Party votes.

See also
 List of Canadian federal electoral districts
 Past Canadian electoral districts

References

 Campaign expense data from Elections Canada
 Web page of this electoral district at Elections Canada (includes district map, info on the candidates, population stats)
Riding history from the Library of Parliament

Notes

Quebec federal electoral districts
Federal electoral districts of Quebec City